HNK Branitelj is a football club based in Rodoč, Mostar in Bosnia and Herzegovina. They played the 2020-21 season at the 4th level of the Bosnia-Herzegovina football pyramid.

Their home ground is Stadion Sportskog Centra in Rodoč which holds about 1,000 people.

History
The team has played in the second tier-Prva Liga FBiH following promotion in 2010–11 when they won Druga Liga FBIH. The team's biggest achievement is playing in the quarterfinals of Bosnia and Herzegovina Football Cup when they were defeated by FK Željezničar 9–0 on aggregate. On their road to quarterfinals they defeated HNK Grude 3–0, NK Doboj Istok 7–0 and club from Premier League of Bosnia and Herzegovina FK Leotar 2–1 on aggregate. They were managed by Slaven Musa at the time. They archived the same stage of the national cup the next year, leaving behind FK Dizdaruša and FK Rudar Kakanj, being defeated by a club from Premier League of Bosnia and Herzegovina and also from the city of Mostar, FK Velež by 3–1 on aggregate.

Club seasons
Sources :

Historical list of coaches

 Romeo Sapina (2006–2013)
 Slaven Musa (2007-2010)
 Zoran Bubalo (2011)
 Ivan Bubalo (2011-2016)
 Romeo Mitrović (2016)
 Ivan Bubalo (2016)

Honours
Second League – South:
Winners (1): 2010–11

References

Football clubs in Bosnia and Herzegovina
Croatian football clubs in Bosnia and Herzegovina
Sport in the Federation of Bosnia and Herzegovina